Anne M. Tréhu is a professor at Oregon State University known for her research on geodynamic processes, especially along plate boundaries. She is an elected fellow of the American Geophysical Union.

Education and career 
Tréhu has a B.A. from Princeton University (1975). In 1982, she earned her Ph.D. from Massachusetts Institute of Technology and Woods Hole Oceanographic Institution where she worked on the seismicity of the Orozco transform fault. From 1982 until 1984 she was a National Research Council postdoc at the United States Geological Survey in Woods Hole. Tréhu joined the faculty at Oregon State University in 1987 and, as of 2021, she is a professor at Oregon State University in the College of Earth, Ocean, and Atmospheric Sciences.

Research 
Tréhu's research centers on studying earthquakes, especially in the Cascadia subduction zone where she investigates where slip and ground shaking will occur in the future earthquakes in the region. As far back as graduate school her work tracking the magnitude and location of earthquakes was noted in the local papers. She uses a network of instruments that track large and small earthquakes, information that will help define when a large earthquake will occur. Tréhu has examined how earthquakes form as continental plates move beneath an adjacent tectonic plate.

Selected publications

Awards and honors 
 Fellow, American Geophysical Union (2008)

References 

Fellows of the American Geophysical Union
Massachusetts Institute of Technology alumni
Princeton University alumni
Living people
Women geophysicists
Year of birth missing (living people)